Bakeapple Barren Northeast is a Canadian peak in the Cape Breton Highlands of Cape Breton Island, and is the third highest elevation point in the province of Nova Scotia, the second highest in Inverness County, Nova Scotia, after The Pinnacle (Cape Breton).

Its nearest higher neighbour, The Pinnacle, lies just  to the west.

References

External links
Peakbagger.com- Bakeapple Barren Northeast, Nova Scotia

Mountains of Nova Scotia
Landforms of Inverness County, Nova Scotia
Mountains of Canada under 1000 metres